Anton Nikitovich Nebylitskiy (born 11 October 1989, in Moscow) is a professional racing driver from Russia.

Career

Formula Renault 2.0
After spending the following season on the sidelines, Nebylitskiy returned to racing in 2006 in the inaugural Formula Renault 2.0 Northern European Cup. Driving for SL Formula Racing, he finished 13th in the standings. He also took part in six Eurocup Formula Renault 2.0 races, but failed to score a point. In November of that year, Nebylitskiy also took part in the British Formula Renault 2.0 Winter series. He would have been classified 17th in the final standings, but was ineligible because he did not hold a valid MSA licence.

The following year, Nebylitskiy took part in a full Eurocup Formula Renault 2.0 season, driving the first ten races of the season with SL Formula Racing before switching to SG Formula for the final four races. Again, he failed to score a championship point. He also contested ten races of the Formula Renault 2.0 Northern European Cup, taking a best race result of sixth at Zolder to finish 22nd in the standings.

Nebylitskiy continued in the Eurocup in 2008, driving for the SG Drivers' Project team. He took a best result of seventh at the final round in Barcelona to end the season in 20th position. He also contested a full Formula Renault 2.0 West European Cup season, finishing the year in seventh place after taking a podium position at Dijon–Prenois.

Formula Renault 3.5 Series

In November 2008, Nebylitskiy took part in Formula Renault 3.5 Series testing at both Paul Ricard and Valencia. After testing with three different teams, Nebylitskiy was signed by Comtec Racing to contest the 2009 season. After the second round of the season at Spa–Francorchamps, he left the team to join the newly created KMP Group/SG Formula outfit. He ended the season 29th overall, with a single hard charger point earned at the Nürburgring.

Nebylitskiy continued in the series in 2010 with new team KMP Racing. He finished in the points on eight occasions, taking a single podium place at Brno to finish in 14th place in the standings. He continued in the championship for a third season in 2011, staying with KMP Racing for a second consecutive year. However, he was replaced after the fifth round of the year at the Nürburgring by fellow Russian and 2010 series champion Mikhail Aleshin, with team boss Bruno Besson explaining that the arrival of an experienced driver would help the team's other driver, Nelson Panciatici, to move nearer the front of the grid.

Racing record

Career results

† – Nebylitskiy was ineligible for the final standings due to him not holding a valid MSA licence.

Complete Formula Renault 3.5 Series results
(key) (Races in bold indicate pole position) (Races in italics indicate fastest lap) (Races with asterisk indicate most gaining positions during the race)

References

External links

Career details from Driver Database

1989 births
Living people
Russian racing drivers
Sportspeople from Moscow
Formula Renault Eurocup drivers
Formula Renault 2.0 NEC drivers
Formula Renault 2.0 WEC drivers
British Formula Renault 2.0 drivers
World Series Formula V8 3.5 drivers
International GT Open drivers
SG Formula drivers
Comtec Racing drivers